Crassacantha bidens is a species of beetle in the family Carabidae, the only species in the genus Crassacantha.

References

Lebiinae